A list of notable journalists from Slovenia:

A – G
 Louis Adamic
 Ivan Ahčin
 Valentin Areh
 Milko Bambič
 Janez Bleiweis
 Izidor Cankar
 Andrej Einspieler
 Jurij Gustinčič

H – P 
 Dušan Jelinčič
 Zoran Jerin
 Josip Jurčič
 Miško Kranjec
 Alojzij Kuhar
 Fran Levstik
 Miša Molk
 Miran Ogrin
 Vladimir Pavšič
 Albin Prepeluh
 Alenka Puhar

R – T 
Anja Rupel
Katja Špur
Janez Stanič
Josip Stritar

V – Ž 
 Valentin Vodnik
 Dimitrij Volčič
 Janez J. Švajncer

 
Journo
Slovenian